Irène Corday (1919–1996) was a French film actress, who played a mixture of lead and supporting roles. She starred in the title role of Thérèse of Lisieux in Thérèse Martin (1939).

Selected filmography
 Prison sans barreaux (1938)
 Lights of Paris (1938)
 Thérèse Martin (1939)
 The Guardian Angel (1942)
 First on the Rope (1944)
 My Wife, My Cow and Me (1952)

References

Bibliography
 Burch, Noël & Sellier, Geneviève. The Battle of the Sexes in French Cinema, 1930–1956. Duke University Press, 2013.

External links

1919 births
1996 deaths
French film actresses
people from Haute-Savoie